The 2016 Australian federal election in the Senate was part of a double dissolution election held on Saturday 2 July to elect all 226 members of the 45th Parliament of Australia, after an extended eight-week official campaign period. It was the first double dissolution election since the 1987 election and the first under a new voting system for the Senate that replaced group voting tickets with optional preferential voting.

The final outcome in the 76-seat Australian Senate took over four weeks to complete despite significant voting changes. Earlier in 2016, legislation changed the Senate voting system from a full-preference single transferable vote with group voting tickets to an optional-preferential single transferable vote. The final Senate result was announced on 4 August: Liberal/National Coalition 30 seats (−3), Labor 26 seats (+1), Greens 9 seats (−1), One Nation 4 seats (+4) and Nick Xenophon Team 3 seats (+2). Former broadcaster and founder of the Justice Party Derryn Hinch, won a seat, while Jacqui Lambie, Liberal Democrat David Leyonhjelm and Family First's Bob Day retained their seats. The number of crossbenchers increased by two to a record 20. The Liberal/National Coalition will require at least nine additional votes to reach a Senate majority, an increase of three.

A number of initially-elected senators were declared ineligible a result of the 2017–18 Australian parliamentary eligibility crisis, and replaced after recounts.

Terms of senators

The two major parties negotiated to allocate a six-year term to the first elected six of twelve senators in each state, while the last six received a three-year term.  This was consistent with the Senate practice on all seven previous occasions. In 1983 the Joint Select Committee on Electoral Reform had unanimously recommended an alternative "recount" method to reflect proportional representation, and the Commonwealth Electoral Act provides for a recount on that basis. This alternative method had been supported by both Labor and the Coalition in two separate, identical, bipartisan senate resolutions, passed in 1998 and 2010. By not adhering to their previous resolutions, Labor and the Coalition each gained one senate seat from 2019.

Australia
The final Senate result was announced on 4 August. The incumbent Liberal/National Coalition government won 30 seats, a net loss of three − the Coalition lost four Senators, one each from New South Wales, Queensland, Western Australia and South Australia, but gained a Senator in Victoria. The Labor opposition won 26 seats, a gain of one − a Senator in Western Australia. The number of crossbenchers increased by two to a record 20. The Liberal/National Coalition would require at least nine additional votes to reach a Senate majority, an increase of three.

New South Wales

Victoria

Queensland

Western Australia

South Australia

Tasmania

Territories

Australian Capital Territory

Northern Territory

Notes

References

2016 Australian federal election
2016 elections in Australia
Senate 2016
Australian Senate elections